The linea terminalis or innominate line consists of the pubic crest, pectineal line (pecten pubis), the arcuate line, the sacral ala, and the sacral promontory.

It is the pelvic brim, which is the edge of the pelvic inlet. The pelvic inlet is typically used to divide the abdominopelvic cavity into an abdominal (above the inlet) and a pelvic cavity (below the inlet). Sometimes, the pelvis cavity is considered to extend above the pelvic inlet, and in this case the pelvic inlet is used to divide the pelvic cavity into a false (above the inlet) and a true pelvis (below the inlet).

Additional images

References

Bones of the pelvis